The Haabʼ is part of the Maya calendric system. It was a 365-day calendar used by many of the pre-Columbian cultures of Mesoamerica.

Description

{|border="1" cellpadding="5" cellspacing="0" align="right" style = "margin-left: 1em;"
|+Haabʼ months: names in glyphs in sequence!style="background:#ffdead;" |No.Seq.
!style="background:#ffdead;" |Name of month
!style="background:#ffdead;" |Glyph examples
!style="background:#ffdead;" |glyph meaning
!style="background:#ffdead;" |No.Seq.
!style="background:#ffdead;" |Name of month
!style="background:#ffdead;" |Glyph examples
!style="background:#ffdead;" |glyph meaning
|-
|style="background:#efefef;"| 1
|Pop|| || mat
|style="background:#efefef;"| 10
|Yax|| || green storm
|-
|style="background:#efefef;"| 2
|Woʼ|| || black conjunction
|style="background:#efefef;"| 11
|Sakʼ|| ||white storm
|-
|style="background:#efefef;"| 3
|Sip|| ||red conjunction
|style="background:#efefef;"| 12
|Keh|| || red storm
|-
|style="background:#efefef;"| 4
|Sotzʼ|| ||bat
|style="background:#efefef;"| 13
|Mak|| || enclosed
|-
|style="background:#efefef;"| 5
|Sek|| ||death
|style="background:#efefef;"| 14
|Kʼankʼin|| ||yellow sun
|-
|style="background:#efefef;"| 6
|Xul|| ||dog
|style="background:#efefef;"| 15
|Muwan|| ||owl
|-
|style="background:#efefef;"| 7
|Yaxkʼin|| ||new sun
|style="background:#efefef;"| 16
|Pax|| ||planting time
|-
|style="background:#efefef;"| 8
|Mol|| ||water
|style="background:#efefef;"| 17
|Kʼayabʼ|| ||turtle
|-
|style="background:#efefef;"| 9
|Chʼen|| || black storm
|style="background:#efefef;"| 18
|Kumkʼu'|| ||granary
|-
|style="background:#efefef;"|  
| || ||  
|style="background:#efefef;"| 19
| || ||five unlucky days
|-
|}
The Haabʼ comprises eighteen months of twenty days each, plus an additional period of five days ("nameless days") at the end of the year known as Wayeb' (or Uayeb'' in 16th-century orthography).

Bricker (1982) estimates that the Haabʼ was first used around 500 BCE with a starting point of the winter solstice.

The Haabʼ month names are most commonly referred to by their names in colonial-era Yucatec (Yukatek). In sequence, these (in the revised orthography) are as seen on the right:
Each day in the Haabʼ calendar was identified by a day number within the month followed by the name of the month. Day numbers began with a glyph translated as the "seating of" a named month, which is usually regarded as day 0 of that month, although a minority treat it as day 20 of the month preceding the named month. In the latter case, the seating of Pop is day 5 of Wayebʼ. For the majority, the first day of the year was Seating Pop. This was followed by 1 Pop, 2 Pop ... 19 Pop, Seating Wo, 1 Wo and so on.

Inscriptions on The Temple of the Cross at Palenque shows clearly that the Maya were aware of the true length of the year, even though they did not employ the use of leap days in their system of calculations generally. J. Eric Thompson wrote that the Maya knew of the drift between the Haabʼ and the solar year and that they made "calculations as to the rate at which the error accumulated, but these were merely noted as corrections they were not used to change the calendar."

5 unlucky days
The five nameless days at the end of the calendar, called Wayebʼ, was thought to be a dangerous time. Foster (2002) writes "During Wayeb, portals between the mortal realm and the Underworld dissolved. No boundaries prevented the ill-intending deities from causing disasters." To ward off these evil spirits, the Mayans had customs and rituals they practised during Wayebʼ. For example, the Mayans would not leave their homes and wash their hair.

Notes

References
 
 
 
 

Maya calendars
Specific calendars